Meditations in B is the debut full-length album by Old Man Gloom. A remastered version of the album was released on April 7, 2015, through Hydra Head Records.

Production
The album was written and recorded in New Mexico in under a week.

Critical reception
Exclaim! wrote: "OMG focuses more on quick, jagged, sonic barbs and drawn out ambient experimentation, rather than the brooding, atmospheric destruction Isis is known for."

Track listing
All tracks written by Perez and Turner.
 "Afraid Of" – 1:16
 "Flood I" – 0:50
 "Simian Alien Technology: Message Received" – 3:27
 "Sonic Wave of Bees" – 1:22
 "Sonar Enlightenment Program" – 5:43
 "Rotten Primate" – 1:47
 "The Exploder Whale" – 1:02
 "Poisoner" – 0:42
 "An Evening at the Gentleman's Club for Apes" – 0:55
 "Vipers" – 0:50
 "Test Result: Alien Ape Distress Signal" – 1:55
 "Flood II" – 1:02
 "Resolving the De-Evolution Conflict" – 1:31
 "Scraps Theatre Presents: Confusion in Five Movements" – 7:01

Credits
 Eric Gallegos – assistant
 Santos "Hanno" Montano - drumming, backup vocals, data backup, viral marketing
 Dave Merullo – editing and mastering
 Old Man Gloom – producing, editing and mastering
 Juan Perez – vocals, consultation, direction and layout concept
 Tim Stroh – production, engineering and mixing
 Aaron Turner – guitar, vocals, noise, engineering, sampling, mixing, layout design, construction and layout concept

References

Old Man Gloom albums
2000 debut albums
Albums with cover art by Aaron Turner